The 2019–20 Liga IV Ialomița, also known as Liga IV Secomi Travel for sponsorship reasons, was the 52nd season of the Liga IV Ialomița, the fourth tier of the Romanian football league system.  The season began on 24 August 2019 and was scheduled to end in June 2020, but was suspended in March because of the COVID-19 pandemic in Romania.

The season was ended officially on 26 July 2020 after a promotion play-off match between the first 2 ranked teams. Bărăganul Ciulnița was crowned as county champion after a play-off match against the second place, Victoria Țăndărei.

Overview

Team changes

To Liga IV Ialomița
Relegated from Liga III
 —Promoted from Liga V Ialomița Înfrățirea Jilavele
 Orezu

From Liga IV IalomițaPromoted to Liga III Recolta Gheroghe DojaRelegated to Liga V Ialomița' Voința Maia

Other changes
 Secunda Adâncata withdrew from Liga IV.
 Recolta Bărcănești spared from relegation.

Competition format
The league was played in a double round-robin format. The team ranked first will crowned county champion and qualify to promotion play-off in Liga III. The last two teams will relegated to Liga V Ialomița County.

League table

Championship play-offBărăganul Ciulnița'' won the 2019–20 Liga IV Ialomița and qualify for promotion play-off to Liga III.

Promotion play-off

Champions of Ialomița County face champions of Liga IV – Bucharest and Liga IV – Giurgiu County.

Region 6 (South)

Group B

See also

Main Leagues
 2019–20 Liga I
 2019–20 Liga II
 2019–20 Liga III
 2019–20 Liga IV

County Leagues (Liga IV series)

 2019–20 Liga IV Alba
 2019–20 Liga IV Arad
 2019–20 Liga IV Argeș
 2019–20 Liga IV Bacău
 2019–20 Liga IV Bihor
 2019–20 Liga IV Bistrița-Năsăud
 2019–20 Liga IV Botoșani
 2019–20 Liga IV Brăila
 2019–20 Liga IV Brașov
 2019–20 Liga IV Bucharest
 2019–20 Liga IV Buzău
 2019–20 Liga IV Călărași
 2019–20 Liga IV Caraș-Severin
 2019–20 Liga IV Cluj
 2019–20 Liga IV Constanța
 2019–20 Liga IV Covasna
 2019–20 Liga IV Dâmbovița
 2019–20 Liga IV Dolj 
 2019–20 Liga IV Galați
 2019–20 Liga IV Giurgiu
 2019–20 Liga IV Gorj
 2019–20 Liga IV Harghita
 2019–20 Liga IV Hunedoara
 2019–20 Liga IV Iași
 2019–20 Liga IV Ilfov
 2019–20 Liga IV Maramureș
 2019–20 Liga IV Mehedinți
 2019–20 Liga IV Mureș
 2019–20 Liga IV Neamț
 2019–20 Liga IV Olt
 2019–20 Liga IV Prahova
 2019–20 Liga IV Sălaj
 2019–20 Liga IV Satu Mare
 2019–20 Liga IV Sibiu
 2019–20 Liga IV Suceava
 2019–20 Liga IV Teleorman
 2019–20 Liga IV Timiș
 2019–20 Liga IV Tulcea
 2019–20 Liga IV Vâlcea
 2019–20 Liga IV Vaslui
 2019–20 Liga IV Vrancea

References

External links
 Official website 

Liga IV seasons
Sport in Ialomița County